Hyundai H-100 is a name used by Hyundai Motor Company in export markets for two related light trucks:

 Hyundai Porter, a pickup truck.
 Hyundai Grace, a minibus/van.

H-100
Light trucks